Francisco Cerúndolo was the defending champion but lost in the semifinals to Sebastián Báez.

Báez won the title after defeating Thiago Monteiro 6–1, 6–4 in the final.

Seeds

Draw

Finals

Top half

Bottom half

References

External links
Main draw
Qualifying draw

Campeonato Internacional de Tênis de Campinas - 1
2021 Singles